Gilbert Gerard (1760–1815) was a Scottish theological writer. The son of Alexander Gerard (1728–1795), he became the minister of the Scots Church, Amsterdam. He was professor of Greek at King's College, Aberdeen, 1791, and of divinity, 1795. In 1803 he was Moderator of the General Assembly of the Church of Scotland.

Life
The son of Very Rev Alexander Gerard, D.D., he was born at Aberdeen 12 August 1760, and studied at King's College, Aberdeen graduating MA in 1777 then studying Divinity at Edinburgh University. On being licensed he became a Church of Scotland minister of the Scots Church in Amsterdam, and during his time there studied modern languages and literature, contributing to the Analytical Review. In 1791 he returned to Aberdeen to occupy the chair of Greek in King's College.

On his father's death, in 1795, Gerard succeeded him in the chair of divinity, and in 1811 he added to his professorship the second charge in the collegiate church of Old Machar in north Aberdeen. He was a king's chaplain, and was elected Moderator of the General Assembly of the Church of Scotland in 1803. He became second charge minister of Old Machar on 19 September 1811, and died 28 September 1815.

Bibliography
 Institutes of Biblical Criticism (Edinburgh, 1808)
 Compendious View of the Evidences of Natural and Revealed Religion (1828) by Alexander and Gilbert Gerard, based on their divinity lectures.

Family
Gerard married, on 3 October 1787, Helen, daughter of John Duncan, three times Provost of Aberdeen, by whom he had six sons and five daughters. Three of the sons, Alexander, James Gilbert, and Patrick, were known as explorers in India.

References

Attribution

1760 births
1815 deaths
Scottish Calvinist and Reformed theologians
19th-century Ministers of the Church of Scotland
Scottish classical scholars
Alumni of the University of Aberdeen
Alumni of the University of Edinburgh
Academics of the University of Aberdeen
Moderators of the General Assembly of the Church of Scotland
18th-century Ministers of the Church of Scotland